Éric K. Boulianne is a Canadian screenwriter and actor from Quebec. He is most noted as the writer of the film Before We Explode (Avant qu'on explose), for which he was a Prix Iris nominee for Best Screenplay at the 21st Quebec Cinema Awards in 2019, and as cowriter with Stéphane Lafleur of the film Viking, for which they received a Canadian Screen Award nomination for Best Original Screenplay at the 11th Canadian Screen Awards in 2023.

Filmography

Writer
Little Brother (Petit frère) - 2014
Prank - 2016
Father and Guns 2 (De père en flic 2) - 2017
Before We Explode (Avant qu'on explose) - 2019
Compulsive Liar (Menteur) - 2019
Heart Bomb (Une bombe au cœur) - 2019
Barbarians of the Bay (Les Barbares de la Malbaie) - 2019
Viking - 2022

Actor
L'Affaire Dumont - 2012
Little Brother (Petit frère) - 2014
Prank - 2016
The Fall of Sparta (La Chute de Sparte) - 2018
Heart Bomb (Une bombe au cœur) - 2019
A Brother's Love (La femme de mon frère) - 2019
There Are No False Undertakings (Il n'y a pas de faux métier) - 2020

References

External links

21st-century Canadian screenwriters
21st-century Canadian male writers
21st-century Canadian male actors
Canadian male film actors
Canadian male television actors
Canadian male screenwriters
Canadian screenwriters in French
French Quebecers
Male actors from Quebec
Writers from Quebec
Living people